Kevin Smith (10 August 1932 – 18 September 1991) was  a former Australian rules footballer who played with North Melbourne and Footscray in the Victorian Football League (VFL).		
		
In 1955 he was transferred to Footscray, where he played alongside Kevin J. Smith.

Notes

External links 
		

1932 births
1991 deaths
Australian rules footballers from Victoria (Australia)
North Melbourne Football Club players
Western Bulldogs players